"Freedom" is a song by Swiss artist DJ BoBo, released in 1995 as the fourth and last single from his second album, There Is a Party (1994). It reached number four in Switzerland, number seven in Austria and Finland, and number eight in Germany. On the Eurochart Hot 100, it peaked at number 15 in November 1995. Outside Europe, the song peaked at number 93 in Australia. The female singers are Natascha Wright and Lisa Noya. Noya is also the female powervoice on songs by German singer Haddaway and her name is stated for all backing vocals on his album, The Album, which were produced by the same producers that produced "Freedom"; Alex Trime and Sven Delgado. It sold to Gold in Germany.

Critical reception
Pan-European magazine Music & Media praised the song for its "catchy chorus and (...) instantly recognizable melody". In their review of the There Is a Party album, the song was deemed "a gambler's best bet."

Music video
The music video for "Freedom" was directed by Frank Paul Husmann-Labusga. He also directed the videos for "Let the Dream Come True" and "There Is a Party".

Track listing

Charts

Weekly charts

Year-end charts

References

 

1995 singles
1995 songs
DJ BoBo songs
English-language Swiss songs
Music videos directed by Frank Paul Husmann
Songs written by DJ BoBo